The discography of American singer and songwriter Justin Timberlake consists of five studio albums, two compilation albums, three extended plays, and 51 singles (including 19 as a featured artist). Timberlake started his music career in 1995, as a member of boy band NSYNC. Following the group's hiatus in 2002, he released his solo debut studio album, Justified, in November that same year. The album was a commercial success and peaked at number two on the US Billboard 200 chart and additionally topped the charts in Ireland and the United Kingdom. Justified earned multiple multi-platinum certifications, including a triple platinum certification from the Recording Industry Association of America (RIAA) and a sextuple platinum certification from the British Phonographic Industry (BPI). It produced four singles: "Like I Love You", "Cry Me a River", "Rock Your Body" and "Señorita"; all performed well commercially, with two of them becoming top 5 hits on the US Billboard Hot 100 chart and top two hits on the UK Singles Chart. "Rock Your Body" also reached number one in Australia.

FutureSex/LoveSounds, Timberlake's second studio album, was released in September 2006. Like its predecessor, the album achieved commercial success internationally and topped the Billboard 200 chart; it also reached number one in countries such as Australia, Canada and the United Kingdom. It was later certified four times platinum by the RIAA and six times platinum by the Australian Recording Industry Association (ARIA); it sold over 10 million copies worldwide. Six singles were released from FutureSex/LoveSounds, including the Billboard Hot 100 chart number-one hits "SexyBack", "My Love" and "What Goes Around... Comes Around". Throughout the late 2000s, Timberlake collaborated with several artists on the Hot 100 top ten singles, including "Give It to Me" by Timbaland, "4 Minutes" by Madonna and "Dead and Gone" by T.I.

In March 2013, after a six-year hiatus from his solo music career, Timberlake released his third studio album, The 20/20 Experience – it topped the charts in various countries and set a digital sales record for being the fastest-selling album on the iTunes Store. The 20/20 Experience was the top-selling album in the United States of 2013, selling 2,427,000 copies by the end of the year. The album spawned three singles including the international hits "Suit & Tie" and "Mirrors"; the latter reached number two on the Hot 100 chart and topped the UK Singles Chart. In September 2013, Timberlake released the second half of the project, The 20/20 Experience – 2 of 2. It produced three singles including "Not a Bad Thing", which reached number eight on the Hot 100 chart. In 2016, Timberlake serves as the executive music producer for the soundtrack to DreamWorks Animation's Trolls, accompanied by the release of "Can't Stop the Feeling!", his fifth chart-topping single on the Hot 100. It was certified Diamond in France and Poland.

On February 2, 2018, Timberlake released his fifth studio album, Man of the Woods. It topped the Billboard 200 with the biggest first week sales of the year at the time, selling 293,000 total units. The album was supported by the two top ten singles, "Filthy" and "Say Something". Man of the Woods also marks Timberlake's fourth consecutive No. 1 album and has since been certified Platinum by the Recording Industry Association of America (RIAA). Man of the Woods concluded 2018 as the sixth best-selling album of the year.

Albums

Studio albums

Compilation albums

Soundtrack albums

Extended plays

Singles

As lead artist

As featured artist

Promotional singles

Other charted songs

Guest appearances

Production discography

See also 
Justin Timberlake videography
List of songs recorded by Justin Timberlake
NSYNC discography

Notes

References

External links 
 Justin Timberlake discography at AllMusic

Discographies of American artists
Discography
Pop music discographies
Rhythm and blues discographies
Production discographies